Split Yard Creek is a rural locality in the Somerset Region, Queensland, Australia.

Geography

The Splityard Creek Dam borders the Wivenhoe-Somerset Road and there is a public carpark on the side of the road with access to the Splityard Creek Lookout. It is home to the Wivenhoe Power Station located between the Splityard Creek Dam and the Wivenhoe Dam.

References 

Suburbs of Somerset Region
Localities in Queensland